Dr. Mario Coyula Cowley was a Cuban architect and architectural historian. He was an authority on the history and preservation of Havana.
Cowley was born in Havana on June 16, 1935, and died in Havana on July 7, 2014, age 79.

Dr. Coyula served as a Robert F. Kennedy Visiting Professor from 2002-2003 at Harvard University in Urban Planning and Design. He was a full professor at the Faculty of Architecture of Havana from 1964, profesor de Mérito (2001), National Award of Architecture (2001), National Habitat Award (2004), and Académico de Mérito (2011). He was director of the school of Architecture, of the City Department of Architecture and Urbanism, and of the Group for the Integrated Development of the Capital (GDIC) all from Havana. Dr. Coyula is also a member of several commissions, scientific councils and advisory councils. He is a co-author of the book Havana: Two Faces of the Antillean Metropolis (London and Chapel Hill: University of North Carolina, 2002) with Roberto Segre and Joseph L. Scarpaci, Jr.
His son is the filmmaker Miguel Coyula.

References

External links
 A collection of essays by Mario Coyula
UN JOBS Mario Coyula
Obituary, Arch Record Magazine

1935 births
2014 deaths
Cuban architects
Cuban architectural historians
20th-century Cuban historians
21st-century Cuban historians